The lord mayor of Copenhagen is the city's mayor and the leader of the Copenhagen City Council. Established in 1938, all lord mayors have since belonged to the Social Democratic Party.

List

Current mayors 
As of the municipal elections of November 19, 2013, Copenhagen has the following mayors:

 Lord mayor: Frank Jensen (Social Democratic Party)
 Mayor of Culture: Franciska Rosenkilde (The Alternative)
 Mayor of Children and Youths: Pia Allerslev (Liberal Party)
 Mayor of Health and Care: Ninna Thomsen (Socialist Party)
 Mayor of Social Affairs: Jesper Christensen (Social Democratic Party)
 Mayor of Technics and the Environment: Ninna Hedeager Olsen (Red-Green Alliance)
 Mayor of Employment and Integration: Cecilia Lonning-Skovgaard (Liberal Party)

See also
 Timeline of Copenhagen

References

  List of mayors from the website of the Copenhagen Municipal Libraries. 

 Mayors
Copenhagen
Mayors
Copenhagen
Lists of political office-holders in Denmark
da:Overborgmester